The 1942 Iowa Hawkeyes football team represented the University of Iowa in the 1942 Big Ten Conference football season. This was Eddie Anderson's last season during his first stint as head coach for the Hawkeyes, before taking time off to serve in World War II.

Schedule

References

Iowa
Iowa Hawkeyes football seasons
Iowa Hawkeyes football